Wayne County School District may refer to:

 Wayne County School District (Georgia)
 Wayne County School District (Kentucky)
 Wayne County School District (Mississippi)
 Wayne Community School District, Iowa
 Wayne County Public Schools, North Carolina
 Wayne County School District (Utah), a school district in Utah
Wayne County Regional Educational Service Agency, Michigan